Michael T. Ullman (born July 29, 1962, San Francisco, California) is an American neuroscientist whose main field of research is the relationship between language, memory and the brain. He is best known for his Declarative/Procedural model of language.

Early life and career
Ullman was born in San Francisco, California. He is an alumnus of the French American International School and Lowell High School (1976–1980), both in San Francisco. He received his BA in Computer Science from Harvard University in 1988 and his PhD from the Department of Brain and Cognitive Sciences, Massachusetts Institute of Technology in 1993. Ullman is currently a full professor at Georgetown University. His primary appointment is in the Department of Neuroscience (Georgetown University Medical Center), with secondary appointments in the Departments of Linguistics, Neurology and Psychology. He is the founding Director of the Brain and Language Lab, founding co-Director of the Center for the Brain Basis of Cognition, and founding Director of the Georgetown Cognitive Neuroscience EEG/ERP Center. He was a Presidential Columnist for American Psychological Society Observer in 2005. He currently lives in Washington D.C. with his daughter Clementina Ullman.

References

External links
Homepage at Georgetown University
Brain and Language Lab at Georgetown University
Center for the Brain Basis of Cognition at Georgetown University
Georgetown Cognitive Neuroscience EEG/ERP Center

1962 births
Living people
Developmental psycholinguists
American cognitive neuroscientists
Harvard University alumni
Massachusetts Institute of Technology School of Science alumni
Georgetown University Medical Center faculty
People from San Francisco
Bilingualism and second-language acquisition researchers
Scientists from California
Educators from California